The Chevron B5 is a sports racing car, designed and developed by British manufacturer Chevron, and built by David Bridges, in 1967. Only one single car was constructed. It was powered by a naturally-aspirated  BRM V8 engine. Over its racing career, spanning 4 years, it won a total of 3 races, and scored 7 podium finishes.

References

Chevron racing cars
Sports prototypes
24 Hours of Le Mans race cars
Group 4 (racing) cars
Sports racing cars